The proton radius puzzle is an unanswered problem in physics relating to the size of the proton. Historically the proton charge radius was measured by two independent methods, which converged to a value of about 0.877 femtometres (1 fm = 10−15 m). This value was challenged by a 2010 experiment using a third method, which produced a radius about 4% smaller than this, at 0.842 femtometres. New experimental results reported in the autumn of 2019 agree with the smaller measurement, as does a re-analysis of older data published in 2022. While some believe that this difference has been resolved, this opinion is not yet universally held.

Problem
Prior to 2010, the proton charge radius was measured using one of two methods: one relying on spectroscopy, and one relying on nuclear scattering.

Spectroscopy method
The spectroscopy method uses the energy levels of electrons orbiting the nucleus. The exact values of the energy levels are sensitive to the distribution of charge in the nucleus. For hydrogen, whose nucleus consists only of one proton, this indirectly measures the proton charge radius. Measurements of hydrogen's energy levels are now so precise that the accuracy of the proton radius is the limiting factor when comparing experimental results to theoretical calculations.

Nuclear scattering
The nuclear method is similar to Rutherford's scattering experiments that established the existence of the nucleus. Small particles such as electrons can be fired at a proton, and by measuring how the electrons are scattered, the size of the proton can be inferred.

2010 experiment
In 2010, Pohl et al. published the results of an experiment relying on muonic hydrogen as opposed to normal hydrogen. Conceptually, this is similar to the spectroscopy method. However, the much higher mass of a muon causes it to orbit 207 times closer than an electron to the hydrogen nucleus, where it is consequently much more sensitive to the size of the proton. The newly measured radius is 4% smaller than the prior measurements, which were believed to be accurate within 1%. (The new measurement's uncertainty limit of only 0.1% makes a negligible contribution to the discrepancy.)

A follow-up experiment by Pohl et al. in August 2016 used a deuterium atom to create muonic deuterium and measured the deuteron radius. This experiment allowed the measurements to be 2.7 times more accurate, but also found a discrepancy of 7.5 standard deviations smaller than the expected value. In 2017 Pohl's group performed yet another experiment, this time using hydrogen atoms that had been excited by two different lasers. By measuring the energy released when the excited electrons fell back to lower-energy states, the Rydberg constant could be calculated, and from this the proton radius inferred. The result is again ~5% smaller than the generally-accepted proton radius. In 2019, another experiment reported a measurement of the proton size using a method that was independent of the Rydberg constant—its result, 0.833 femtometers, agreed with the smaller 2010 value once more.

Proposed resolutions
The anomaly remains unresolved and is an active area of research. There is as yet no conclusive reason to doubt the validity of the old data. The immediate concern is for other groups to reproduce the anomaly.

The uncertain nature of the experimental evidence has not stopped theorists from attempting to explain the conflicting results. Among the postulated explanations are the three-body force, interactions between gravity and the weak force, or a flavour-dependent interaction, higher dimension gravity, a new boson, and the quasi-free  hypothesis.

Measurement artefact
Randolf Pohl, the original investigator of the puzzle, stated that while it would be "fantastic" if the puzzle led to a discovery, the most likely explanation is not new physics but some measurement artefact. His personal assumption is that past measurements have misgauged the Rydberg constant and that the current official proton size is inaccurate.

Quantum chromodynamic calculation
In a paper by Belushkin et al. (2007), including different constraints and perturbative quantum chromodynamics, a smaller proton radius than the then-accepted 0.877 femtometres was predicted.

Proton radius extrapolation
Papers from 2016 suggested that the problem was with the extrapolations that had typically been used to extract the proton radius from the electron scattering data though these explanation would require that there was also a problem with the atomic Lamb shift measurements.

Data analysis method
In one of the attempts to resolve the puzzle without new physics, Alarcón et al. (2018) of Jefferson Lab have proposed that a different technique to fit the experimental scattering data, in a theoretically as well as analytically justified manner, produces a proton charge radius from the existing electron scattering data that is consistent with the muonic hydrogen measurement. Effectively, this approach attributes the cause of the proton radius puzzle to a failure to use a theoretically motivated function for the extraction of the proton charge radius from the experimental data. Another recent paper has pointed out how a simple, yet theory motivated change to previous fits will also give the smaller radius.

2019 measurements 
In September 2019, Bezginov et al. reported the remeasurement of the proton's charge radius for electronic hydrogen and found a result consistent with Pohl's value for muonic hydrogen. In November W. Xiong et al. reported a similar result using extremely low momentum transfer electron scattering.

Their results support the smaller proton charge radius, but do not explain why the results before 2010 came out larger. It is likely future experiments will be able to both explain and settle the proton radius puzzle.

2022 analysis 
A re-analysis of experimental data, published in February 2022, found a result consistent with the smaller value of approximately 0.84 fm.

Footnotes

References

2010 in science
2019 in science
Proton